The Life And Times Of Absolute Truth is South African rock band Tree63's fourth album. It was released in 2002. The songs on this album gained popularity in Australia, Canada, South Africa and the UK.

Track listing
 "The Glorious Ones" - 3:30
 "All Hands" - 3:17
 "No Words" - 3:50
 "All Because" - 4:31 
 "Anxious Seat" - 2:49
 "Here of All Places" - 
 "Be All End All" - 4:08
 "It's All About to Change" - 2:51
 "Surprise Surprise" - 3:16
 "How Did I Sleep?" - 8:49

References

2002 albums
Tree63 albums